Mercy, Mercy may refer to:

Mercy, Mercy (band), band which had a hit with "It Must Be Heaven" 1984
Mercy, Mercy (album), Buddy Rich 1968
"Mercy, Mercy" (song), Don Covay 1964

See also 
"Mercy, Mercy, Mercy",  jazz song written by Joe Zawinul in 1966 for
Mercy, Mercy, Mercy! Live at 'The Club', album by Julian "Cannonball" Adderley
"Mercy Mercy Me (The Ecology)", 1971 song by Marvin Gaye